Camille Trail (born  ) is an Australian country musician from Baralaba, Queensland. She released her debut album, River of Sins, in August 2021.

Career

Camille Trail was born   in Baralaba, Queensland, and began learning piano aged 8. She performed her first gig at the Baralaba Hotel, aged 14. After high school she studied music at JMC Academy in Brisbane, and began writing her debut album.

After sending demos to country musician-producer, Shane Nicholson, they recorded together across six weeks in February 2019, with Nicholson featuring on vocals for a track. Trail released her first single, "Humming Chain", in that year. To pay Nicholson, Trail sold two bulls from her family's cattle station, Murrindindi. The recording sessions were used as her final university assessment and became her debut album, River of Sins, which was released in 2021. It peaked at No. 5 on the ARIA Australian Artist Country Albums chart. Gareth Bryant of scenstr.com.au felt Trail has an "innate ability to weave blues, gospel and folk into her alt. country, Americana soundscapes, creating poignant snapshots of vulnerability soaked in the human spirit."

In 2021 she was nominated for New Talent of the Year at the 50th annual Golden Guitar Awards, and in 2022 her single, "I Know I'm Hard to Love" was nominated for the Country Award at the Queensland Music Awards.

Discography

Studio albums

Singles

Awards

Country Music Awards (CMAA)

Queensland Music Awards

References 

Living people
Australian country musicians
Date of birth missing (living people)
Year of birth missing (living people)
1990s births